is a 1996 Japanese kaiju film directed by Shusuke Kaneko, with special effects by Shinji Higuchi. Produced by Daiei Film and distributed by Toho, the film is the 10th entry in the Gamera film series, as well as the second film in the franchise's Heisei period, serving as a direct sequel to the 1995 film Gamera: Guardian of the Universe. The film stars Toshiyuki Nagashima, Miki Mizuno, Tamotsu Ishibashi, and Mitsuru Fukikoshi, with Ayako Fujitani and Yukijirō Hotaru reprising their roles from the previous film, and with Akira Ohashi portraying the giant turtle monster Gamera.

Gamera 2: Attack of Legion also features Mizuho Yoshida as Legion, a race of insectoid extraterrestrials that invade Earth, prompting Gamera to come to the planet's defense. The film was released theatrically in Japan on July 13, 1996, and was followed by  Gamera 3: Revenge of Iris in 1999.

Plot
A year has passed since the battle between Gamera and the Gyaos and Japan has struggled to rebuild its cities in the meantime. The military has kept a cautious vigil on the nation's coast, but so far Gamera has yet to return. Then on the night of a meteor shower, while out on field trip, Science instructor Midori Honami and her group of kids witness a huge meteor plunge into the mountain snow. The next night, two security guards are horrified as they see large insect-like creatures stealing glass bottles from a nearby warehouse. Soon after, the entire city of Sapporo is covered with strange plants and the link between these events soon becomes clear. These series of bizarre incidents reveal a new threat to the Land of the Rising Sun.

The meteor has carried with it a species of extraterrestrials. These aliens, which have a unique form of biochemistry that involves silicon, have set up a hive in the bowels of the city's subway tunnels, deliberately nurturing a plant that grows out of the subway and into the city. Soon a gigantic pod erupts from a building and Colonel Watarase of the Self Defense Force realizes that it is dramatically raising the city's oxygen levels. Working together with the swift-minded Miss Honami, he realizes that the aliens are building a huge biological launchpad: the increased oxygen will aid the creatures in exploding the flower, catapulting its seed into space so that they can colonize yet another world. The military can only watch helplessly, as any attempt to destroy the plant would destroy all of Sapporo.

Just as all hope is lost, Gamera emerges from the sea and heads toward the besieged city. He tears the flower out by its roots, but is ambushed by a swarm of the alien insect soldiers. As Gamera thrashes to rid himself of the attacking insects, a nearby soldier names them "Legion", in reference to something similar about a person possessed by many evil spirits called Legion mentioned in the Holy Bible. Gamera is forced to retreat, just as the monstrous Legion queen, the Mother Legion, bursts out of the ground and flies off to start a second hive. Her wings are damaged by fighter jets, but she survives. Again a Legion flower blooms, this time in Sendai, and again Gamera attempts to stop its explosion. He is intercepted, however, by Legion. Legion makes short work of Gamera, impaling him with her sharp legs and blasting him with her horn beam. Sensing the detonation of her pod approaching, Legion leaves Gamera for dead and burrows off. Gamera limps toward the plant, destroying it by knocking it down before it launches its seed into space. The flower explodes and completely annihilates Sendai, seemingly killing Gamera.

Japan's military and scientists race to find Legion's weakness, but have so far found only one clue: the smaller symbiotic Legion are attracted to any electromagnetic source, such as power lines. While this may enable the army to distract them, it has the unfortunate side-effect of drawing them to Tokyo. With the failure of both their previous attempts at propagating their kind, the Legion are growing desperate. Asagi travels to Sendai where Gamera lies comatose and as she tries to reach out to him, the orihalcum magatama that enables their bond shatters. Gamera awakens, but at the sacrifice of his human connection.

Mother Legion marches onward towards Tokyo with the intention of planting a third and final flower, but Gamera intercepts her at Ashikaga. She spawns a swarm of insect soldiers against him, but the military manages to draw them off and destroy them using a power station's electrical pylons. Gamera fights on, but is unable to get his attacks past Mother Legion's claws, which generate an electromagnetic field that dissipates Gamera's fire. After the JSDF blows off several of Mother Legion's claws, Gamera manages to tear off her horn and she momentarily collapses in defeat. Enraged, Mother Legion gets back up and begins lashing Gamera with crimson energy tendrils referred to as the Red Rod, searing Gamera's skin and rapidly overpowering him. On the verge of defeat, Gamera then looks into the sky and roars and light begins to shine down upon him. As Legion closes in, Gamera's chest opens up and fires a powerful plasma beam. Legion is hit by the blast and is blown apart.

Gamera glances toward the human onlookers and then ascends into the morning sky. As they watch Gamera fades into the distance, mankind is unsettled by his power and trembles lest he should ever view humanity as an enemy.

Cast
 Toshiyuki Nagashima as Colonel Watarase
 Miki Mizuno as Midori Honami
 Tamotsu Ishibashi as Hanatani
 Mitsuru Fukikoshi as Obitsu
 Ayako Fujitani as Asagi Kusanagi, a young girl with a spiritual connection to Gamera.
 Yûsuke Kawazu  as Akio Nojiri
 Akira Ohashi as Gamera - The film's titular kaiju, Gamera is a giant flying, fireball-breathing turtle that was created thousands of years ago by an advanced civilization to defend the Earth from world-threatening forces.
 Mizuho Yoshida as Legion - The main villain, Legion is a race of extraterrestrials that resemble ants which travel across the galaxy to colonize unsuspecting planets, killing off the native populace in the process.
 Yukijirō Hotaru as Osako

Production
The film began production in 1995.

Release
Gamera 2: Attack of Legion was released theatrically in Japan on July 13, 1996, where it was distributed by Toho. It was released directly to video on DVD in the United States in 2003 by ADV Films.

Reception
The film was the first daikaiju film to win the Nihon SF Taisho Award (the Japanese Nebula Award) in 1996.  This decision sparked a fierce debate in the Japanese Science Fiction community, with many critics arguing that it signaled the decline of Japanese SF literature.

See also
List of killer insect films

Notes

References 

Bibliography

External links

 
 
 Gamera web archive (Japanese) at gamera.jp
 title=ガメラ2 レギオン襲来 (Gamera Tsū: Region Shūrai) in Japanese at the Japanese Movie Database

1996 films
1996 science fiction films
1996 fantasy films
Japanese science fiction films
Gamera films
Kaiju films
Giant monster films
1990s monster movies
Alien invasions in films
Films about extraterrestrial life
Films about insects
Films directed by Shusuke Kaneko
Japanese sequel films
Films set in Sapporo
Films set in Sendai
Films set in Tochigi Prefecture
Daiei Film films
Toho tokusatsu films
Films scored by Kow Otani
1990s Japanese films